Pine Point (formerly Muloowurtie) is a locality in the Australian state of South Australia on the east side of Yorke Peninsula adjacent to Gulf St Vincent.  It was surveyed as a government town in 1883 and proclaimed under the name of Muloowurtie  on 24 January 1884.  The name was changed to Pine Point in 1940.  The boundaries of the locality were created in May 1999 in respect to the "long established name" and includes both "the Pine Point Shack Site" and " the Government Town of Pine Point."

See also
List of cities and towns in South Australia
Pine Point (disambiguation)

References

External links

Towns in South Australia
Yorke Peninsula
Gulf St Vincent